Vlaminck is a crater on Mercury. Its name was adopted by the International Astronomical Union (IAU) in 1985. Vlaminck is named for the French painter Maurice de Vlaminck.

References

Impact craters on Mercury